SS Saturn was a small freighter built before the First World War. Completed in 1906, she was intended for the West African trade. The ship was captured and scuttled by the German submarine SM U-57 in October 1916.

Description 
She had a vertical triple-expansion steam engine driving a single screw propeller.

Construction and career 
Saturn was laid down as yard number 377 by Anderson Rodger and Company at its shipyard in Port Glasgow, Scotland, for the Palatine Shipping Co. as Thirlmere. Named after Thirlmere, the ship was launched on 4 February 1904 and completed on the 26th. She was transferred to the Watson Steamship Co. on 30 October 1906 before Palatine was wound down in early 1907. Thirlmere was sold to Det Bergenske Dampskibsselkab of Bergen, Norway, and renamed Saturn on 6 February 1912.

References

Bibliography

Ships built on the River Clyde
Steamships of the United Kingdom
Maritime incidents in 1916
World War I merchant ships of Norway
1904 ships
Steamships of Norway